Biz, BIZ or The Biz may refer to:
 Belize, IOC code BIZ
 Biz, colloquial for business
 Biz (detergent), a laundry detergent
 People:
 Biz Mackey (1897—1965), American catcher and manager in Negro league baseball
 Biz Markie (1964–2021), American rapper, singer, DJ, record producer, actor, comedian, and writer
 Biz Stone (born 1974), co-founder of Twitter
 .biz, a generic top-level domain name
 BIZ (Berliner Illustrirte Zeitung), a German news magazine
 BIZ (German: Bank für internationalen Zahlungsausgleich), the Bank for International Settlements
 ISO 639 code for the Ngiri language, native to the Democratic Republic of the Congo
 The Biz (album), 1995, by The Sea and Cake
 The Biz (newspaper), a weekly newspaper published in New South Wales, Australia from 1917 to 1980
 The Biz (TV series), a BBC children's drama series which originally aired from 1994 to 1996
 The Biz (video game), a 1984 computer game about managing a rock band

See also
Byz (disambiguation)
Show biz